The Heinkel HD 35 was a trainer developed in Germany in the 1920s. It was a conventional single-bay biplane with staggered wings of equal span. The design was based on that of the HD 21, and like that aircraft, it had three open cockpits in tandem, although the most forward of these was usually faired over when not in use.

The Swedish Air Force bought an example to evaluate as a replacement for the World War I-vintage Albatros B.IIs it was then using for training. This aircraft was designated Sk 5 and was flight tested until March 1927, at which time it was judged inadequate in performance. It was subsequently sold onto the civil market and was eventually acquired by the Flygvapenmuseum, where it is preserved. The Heinkel HD 35 is comparable to Curtiss JN-4 Jenny in general specifications.

Operators

Swedish Air Force

Specifications

Aircraft of comparable role, configuration and era
 Curtiss JN-4 Jenny

References

External links

 Heinkel HD 35 - description and images

1920s German civil trainer aircraft
HD 35
Aircraft first flown in 1926